Fingle Bridge is a 17th-century stone arch bridge carrying an unclassified road over the River Teign near Drewsteignton, within Dartmoor National Park in Devon, England. This packhorse bridge has three arches and the two central piers are surrounded by triangular cutwaters extending upwards to form pedestrian refuges, and is a Grade II* listed building.

History

Fingle Bridge takes its name from Fingle Brook, a minor tributary which flows into the Teign adjacent to the bridge. Fingle is derived from the old English "fang", meaning to catch, a reference to the suitability of the stretch of river for fishing. 

In its early years the bridge was an important crossing over the Teign used by packhorses transporting corn and wood products across the gorge, although the track up to Cranbrook Castle is now an unmaintained byway such that the bridge leads only to a car park on the south side of the river for roadgoing vehicles, the bridge's function having been replaced by the larger and more accessible Dogmarsh Bridge further upstream on the A382 road.

The arches were repaired, believed by English Heritage to have been in the 19th century.

In 1897 Jesse Ashplant founded the Fingle Bridge Tea Shelter on the north landing of the bridge, serving refreshments to the fishermen, tourists and grain carriers of the day. This developed into the Anglers' Rest pub and was later renamed as the Fingle Bridge Inn.

In 1955 Fingle Bridge was designated a Grade II listed building, reclassified in 1967 as Grade II*.

Related buildings

The track leading south to Cranbrook Castle is also the site of one of the Dartmoor crosses which is in the style of a granite slab with the cross engraved on it.

References

Historic trails and roads in the United Kingdom
Grade II* listed bridges in England
Bridges in Devon
Deck arch bridges
Grade II* listed buildings in Devon
Bridges completed in the 17th century
Stone bridges in England
Packhorse bridges
Moretonhampstead